Conopomorpha chionosema is a moth of the family Gracillariidae. It is known from South Africa, Namibia and Zimbabwe.

The larvae feed on Berchemia discolor. They probably mine the leaves of their host plant.

References

Conopomorpha
Lepidoptera of Namibia
Lepidoptera of South Africa
Lepidoptera of Zimbabwe
Moths of Sub-Saharan Africa
Moths described in 1961